3×3 Eyes (pronounced  in Japanese) is a Japanese manga series written and illustrated by Yuzo Takada and first serialized in Kodansha's seinen manga magazine Young Magazine Kaizokuban from 1987 to 1989. It was then transferred to Weekly Young Magazine, where it was serialized from 1987 to 2002. These two serializations were originally published in 40 tankobon volumes.

From December 26, 2014, to August 12, 2016, a manga sequel titled , began on the manga website Young Magazine Kaizokuban (later renamed e Young Magazine in 2015) The series is compiled into 4 volumes.

On December 22, 2016, a second manga sequel, titled , began serialization on e Young Magazine online manga magazine. It was transferred to Monthly Young Magazine on February 20, 2019. As of November 26, 2022, the two serializations have been published in 7 volumes.

Volume List

3×3 Eyes

Original release
Kodansha (Yanmaga KC Special/Young Magazine Comics, 1988–2002)

Re-releases
Kodansha (KC Deluxe, 2002)

Kodansha (Kodansha Manga Bunko, 2009–2010)

Dark Horse English release
Dark Horse (Trade Paperback, 1995–2004)

3×3 Eyes: Genjū no Mori no Sōnansha
Kodansha (Yanmaga KC Special, 2015–2016)

3×3 Eyes: Kiseki no Yami no Keiyakusha
Kodansha (Yanmaga KC Special, 2017–Present)

Notes

References

Anime and manga lists